Epitacio Agapay (born October 28, 1965), better known as Tacy Macalos, is a Filipino former professional boxer who competed from 1984 to 1994. He won the IBF Light flyweight title in 1988.

Professional career

Macalos turned professional in 1984 and compiled a record of 23–4–3 before facing and defeating Choi Jum-hwan, to win the IBF Light flyweight title. He would lose the title in his first defense against Muangchai Kittikasem.

Professional boxing record

Boxing trainer
Macalos would retire in 1994 & would go on to be come a boxing trainer.

See also
List of world light-flyweight boxing champions
List of Filipino boxing world champions

References

External links

 

1965 births
Living people
Filipino male boxers
Sportspeople from Southern Leyte
International Boxing Federation champions
World light-flyweight boxing champions
Boxing trainers